Yahu-Bihdi (Akkadian: 𒅀𒌑𒁉𒀪𒁲 ia-ú-bi-ʾ-di) also called Ilu-Bihdi (Akkadian: 𒀭𒁉𒀪𒁲 ìl-bi-ʾ-di) was a governor of Hamath appointed by the Assyrian government. He declared himself king of Hamath in 720 BC and led a revolt which was promptly suppressed. Yahu-Bihdi himself was flayed alive. His revolt occurred roughly shortly after the conquest of the Kingdom of Israel by Sargon II and roughly simultaneously with revolts in Babylon as well as in Arpad, Damascus and elsewhere in the Levant.

His name, with the component Yahu (coupled with the fact that 'Ilu' was considered an appropriate substitutive element), suggests that he may have been an Israelite — though Sargon called him a Hittite — or a worshipper of Yahweh. Following his defeat, many residents of Hamath were deported to Samaria by the Assyrians, where they became one of the component groups of the Samaritan people. Hamath itself was destroyed after the siege, but had been rebuilt by the 400's BC.

References

8th-century BC deaths
Ancient Assyrians
Ancient Syria
People executed by flaying
People executed by the Neo-Assyrian Empire
People executed for treason
Samaritan culture and history
Syro-Hittite kings
Year of birth unknown
1st-millennium BC executions
8th-century BC people